The Bangladesh men's national field hockey team represents Bangladesh in men's international field hockey and is controlled by the Bangladesh Hockey Federation.

History

Earlier history
Hockey was introduced in Bengal during the British period. The game was introduced in Dhaka around 1905 under the patronage of Nawab Sir Khwaja Salimullah (1866-1915). But the game remained confined to the Nawabs’ family circle. At that time, football was more popular among the masses of this region. Despite this, the game made great progress due to untiring efforts of some sports patrons and organizers. During the World War II, a team of the hockey wizard Dhyan Chand, a member of the Gurkha Regiment, played an exhibition match at Armanitola in Dhaka.

With the Partition of Bengal in 1947, the growth of hockey was impeded. Many of the people, who played and loved hockey, migrated to India. As a result, hockey turned into a seasonal game. Hockey was played only for two or three months in the year also due to the inadequacy of playgrounds and unfavorable weather conditions in other months of the year.

During the Pakistan period, the East Pakistan hockey team took part in a number of tournaments including All Pakistan National Hockey Championship. In 1969, Dhaka successfully hosted the final round of the Pakistan National Hockey Championship.

20th century
The 'Bangladesh Hockey Federation (BHF)' was founded in 1972. The federation acquired full membership of the International Hockey Federation and of the Asian Hockey Federation in 1975. In 1987, a hockey stadium was built in Dhaka, which is now known as the Maulana Bhasani Hockey Stadium. Since then it has been the home of hockey and the office of  BHF in Bangladesh where all levels of hockey are being played and controlled. The Federation regularly arranges hockey leagues, tournaments, and the National Youth and Senior Championships. At the home level, hockey matches including Premier Division Hockey League, First Division Hockey League, Second Division Hockey League, National Hockey League, National Youth Hockey League, Independence Day Hockey Tournament, National Hockey Championship, National Youth Hockey Championship, Victory Day Hockey Tournament, School Tournaments and hosted various international tournaments with distinction.

Bangladesh started taking part in international hockey tournaments by participating in the 1st Junior World Cup for Asia/Oceania zone qualifying round in Kuala Lumpur in 1977. The country also played  in the Asian games held in Bangkok in 1978. Since then Bangladesh Hockey Team is participating in Asian games. It took part in the 1st Asia Cup in Karachi in 1982. In 1985, Dhaka hosted the Second Asia Hockey Cup, Capt chaklader was the team captain. Bangladesh performed superbly. Hockey world observed the highest gatherings in any tournaments. India, Pakistan, Korea, Malaysia, China, Japan, Sri Lanka, Singapore, Iran, and Bangladesh took part in this tournament. Bangladesh also hosted an international invitational hockey tournament in 1997. India, Pakistan and Sri Lanka were the participants.

Competitive record

Asian Games
 1978 – 6th place
 1982 – 9th place
 1986 – 7th place
 1994 – 7th place
 1998 – 9th place
 2002 – 7th place
 2006 – 7th place
 2010 – 8th place
 2014 – 8th place
 2018 – 6th place
 2022 – Qualified

Asia Cup
 1982 – 5th place
 1985 – 6th place
 1989 – 7th place
 1993 – 6th place
 1999 – 6th place
 2003 – 8th place
 2007 – 7th place
 2009 – 7th place
 2013 – 7th place
 2017 – 6th place
 2022 – 6th place

Asian Champions Trophy
 2021 – 5th place

Hockey World League
 2012–14 – 19th place
 2014–15 – 28th place
 2016–17 – 27th place

AHF Cup
2008 – 
2012 – 
2016 – 
 2022 –

South Asian Games
 1995 – 
 2006 – 4th place
 2010 – 
 2016 –

See also
 Bangladesh women's national field hockey team

References

External links
Official website
FIH profile

Field hockey
Asian men's national field hockey teams
National team
Men's sport in Bangladesh